Ahmed Youssef Belgasem (born October 15, 1987) is a Libyan road racing cyclist. He represented Libyan Arab Jamahiriya (now Libya) at the 2008 Summer Olympics in Beijing, where he competed in the men's road race. Belgasem, however, did not finish the run, before reaching the 150.2 km lap of the course. In 2010, Belgasem won his first ever career title at the third annual Tour of Libya.

References

External links
 
 NBC Olympics Profile
 

1987 births
Living people
Libyan male cyclists
Cyclists at the 2008 Summer Olympics
Olympic cyclists of Libya
Place of birth missing (living people)